Oliver Marach and Mate Pavić were the defending champions, but lost to Ben McLachlan and Jan-Lennard Struff in the semifinals.

McLachlan and Struff went on to win the title, defeating Raven Klaasen and Michael Venus in the final, 6–3, 6–4.

Seeds

Draw

Draw

References

External links
 Main Draw

ASB Classic - Men's Doubles
2019 Doubles
ASB